Birch Monroe (May 16, 1901 – May 15, 1982) was an American old time and early bluegrass fiddler, bassist, dancer, founding member of the Monroe brothers, and older brother to Charlie and Bill Monroe. He grew up on a farm with five brothers and sisters before leaving it in the late twenties. Unlike brothers Charlie and Bill he chose to not pursue a career in music.

Early days 
Monroe was born near Rosine, in Western Kentucky. Like his five brothers and sisters he helped out on the six-hundred-and-fifty-five-acre property farm where their father made a living mining coal, cutting timber and farming.

Growing up with a mother that sang old-time songs and ballads, played harmonica, button accordion and fiddle and a father that was a dancer, folk traditions of home entertainment was part of the family life. Fiddle player, uncle Pen Vandiver, who Monroe has told that was a fine person «and never did get in a hurry over anything» also lived nearby. He frequently played at dances in the community. The siblings was involved with music and most of them played instruments and learned shape note singing through visiting teachers in the Baptist and Methodist churches of Rosine. Birch's main instrument was the fiddle.

Leaving the farm 
Monroe and his brother Charlie left the family farm in Rosine in the 1920s to work in the booming northern factories of the time. When Bill joined them in 1929 they were working in East Chicago, Indiana at the Sinclair Oil refinery. There, the brothers played local venues and dances. Monroe, with his brothers played on WWAE in Hammond, Indiana and also performed weekly on WJKS in Gary. In 1932, the three, along with a friend, Larry Moore, were hired as exhibition square dancers for the national barn dance radio program, broadcast from Chicago. In 1934, Monroe chose the stability of working at the refinery to support his sisters while Charlie and Bill went on to perform on KFNF in Shenandoah, Iowa.

Later performances
After the war, Monroe had a few performances with Bill. One of them include "Just a Little Talk with Jesus" at a 1948 performance in the Grand Ole Opry. Monroe played bass on tour with Bill after Howard Watts left the band. In late April 1963 he joined Bill Monroe for a performance with The Bluegrass Boys in Bean Blossom. Monroe was also manager, in the early 1960s, of Bill Monroe's country music park, the Brown County Jamboree, in Bean Blossom, Indiana. On July 3, 1969, at the Smithsonian Festival of American Culture, Monroe performed with Bill and Charlie. Birch can also be found on radio transcriptions that Charlie Monroe made in 1944 for the Noon-Day Jamboree released on County Records in 1974. In 1976 he performed at the Bean Blossom Bluegrass Festival.

Death 
Monroe died on May 15, 1982 the day before he would turn 81. The funeral was held at the Rosine Methodist Church in Rosine on Tuesday, May 18.

Discography

Original Releases

With Bill Monroe

Singles 

*Sang bass on Wicked Path Of Sin

Compilations

Live albums

With Charlie Monroe 

Source:

References

Bibliography
 Rosenberg, Neil V. Bluegrass: a History. Urbana: University of Illinois Press, 2005. 
 Smith, Richard D. Can't You Hear Me Callin': the Life of Bill Monroe, Father of Bluegrass. Cambridge, MA: Da Capo Press, 2001. 

1901 births
1982 deaths
People from Ohio County, Kentucky
People from East Chicago, Indiana
20th-century American musicians
American bluegrass fiddlers
Bluegrass musicians from Kentucky
Country musicians from Kentucky
Country musicians from Indiana